The Champion is a grade II listed public house in Wells Street, in the City of Westminster, London. It was built around 1860 to 1870 of gault brick with stucco dressings and a slate roof. Historic England comment on its "lively classical detailing". It was refitted by architects John Robson Reid and Sylvia Reid in the 1950s following a competition in Architectural Review.

References

External links 

Grade II listed pubs in the City of Westminster
Fitzrovia